Me and the Pumpkin Queen is a 2007 children's novel by Marlane Kennedy and published by Greenwillow Books, An Imprint of HarperCollinsPublishers.  The book's subject is inspired by Kennedy's youthful familiarity with the Circleville Pumpkin Show.  The book has been chosen as a Junior Library Guild Selection.  Santa Monica Public Library also lists the book as recommended reading for kids.

Plot

The plot centers around an eleven-year-old girl named Mildred whose mother, a former "pumpkin queen", died in Mildred's sixth year of life.  Inspired by an image of her mother "wearing her Pumpkin Queen crown," Mildred tries to grow giant pumpkins in order to win a contest at the Circleville Pumpkin Show.

Reception 
The book has received an overwhelmingly positive reception from reviewers.  J. A. Kaszuba Locke describes the book as "a chummy read, projecting heartwarming tenderness and a youngster's determination."  Robin Smith describes the book as a "marvelously heartwarming story [that] deserves a big blue ribbon!"  Naomi Kirsten asserts that the book is "Big on heart and pumpkins!"  Kathryn Kosiorek notes that "The author combines the art and science of horticulture with a gentle family story, a feel for a child in mourning, and just the right amount of humor and tension to keep the plot moving along."  Ilene Cooper refers to "Kennedy's straightforward narrative" as "lovely."  Finally, Kennedy has received praise for her inclusion of "unexpectedly fascinating pumpkin-horticulture facts" in the book.

See also

Pumpkin queen

References

External links
Official publisher's website

American children's novels
2007 American novels
2007 children's books